Véronique Ahoyo (June 29, 1939 - December 14, 2008) was a Beninese politician and civil Administrator .

Born in Cotonou, Ahoyo received training in civil administration in Paris and Abidjan, and in social services in Toulouse. Returning to Benin, she took a post as deputy director of social affairs in 1967. In 1972 she graduated with a Master in Applied Social Sciences from the University of Abidjan, in Côte d'Ivoire. She was promoted to director of social affairs in 1975. She left the role in 1990; in March of that year she was named Minister of Labor and Social Affairs. For a time she also served as the Beninese ambassador to Canada. Ahoyo was killed in an automobile accident on the Bassila highway when the vehicle in which she was traveling lost control after a tire burst. Four others were also killed and two injured; among the latter was former Minister of Public Health Rafiatou Karimou.

References 

1940 births
2008 deaths
Ambassadors of Benin to Canada
Government ministers of Benin
Labor ministers
Social affairs ministers
Université Félix Houphouët-Boigny alumni
Beninese expatriates in France
Road incident deaths in Benin
People from Cotonou
20th-century Beninese women politicians
20th-century Beninese politicians
Beninese women ambassadors
Women government ministers of Benin